"I Won't Forget You" is a power ballad by the American glam metal band Poison, originally from the album Look What the Cat Dragged In.

Released as a single in 1987 on the Enigma label of Capitol Records, the song peaked at number 13 on the Billboard Hot 100 in The US, and is considered one of Poison's best songs.

Background
The song, along with "Talk Dirty to Me", "Fallen Angel" and "Ride the Wind", was the subject of a lawsuit in 2011 by members of the defunct band Kid Rocker, who claimed that the songs were based on Kid Rocker songs played to the Poison guitarist C.C. DeVille before he was a member of Poison.

The live, daytime concert footage for the official music video for "I Won't Forget You" was recorded at the 1987 Texxas Jam in Dallas, Texas. Despite the song's success, it was dropped from the band's live shows in 1988 and did not return to the setlist until 2003, as noted by the vocalist Bret Michaels that year when the band was about to play the song.

Reception 
"I Won't Forget You" is widely regarded as one of Poison's best songs. In 2017, Billboard and OC Weekly ranked the song number eight and number six, respectively, on their lists of the 10 greatest Poison songs.

Personnel 
 Bret Michaels - Lead Vocals, Acoustic Guitar, Backing Vocals  
 C.C. DeVille - Lead Guitar, Rhythm Guitar (Used in the choruses and sporadically in the verses), Backing Vocals 
 Bobby Dall - Bass, Backing Vocals 
 Rikki Rockett - Drums, Backing Vocals

Charts

References

1980s ballads
1986 songs
1987 singles
Songs written by Bobby Dall
Songs written by Bret Michaels
Songs written by Rikki Rockett
Songs written by C.C. DeVille
Poison (American band) songs
Enigma Records singles
Capitol Records singles
Glam metal ballads